Taihu Xiangshan Station is the South-Western terminus of Line 5, Suzhou Rail Transit. The station is located in Wuzhong District, Jiangsu, within the Xiangshan area of Lake Tai. It has been in use since June 29, 2021; when Line 5 first opened to the public.

References 

Railway stations in Jiangsu
Suzhou Rail Transit stations
Railway stations in China opened in 2021